Kal Swan (born 20 April 1963) is a Scottish hard rock vocalist and songwriter. He is best known as the vocalist for the bands Lion, Tytan, and Bad Moon Rising.

Discography

KUNI
1986 - Masque (vocals on "Restless Heart")

Tytan
1985 – Rough Justice

Lion
1986 – Power Love
1986 – The Transformers The Movie: Original Motion Picture Soundtrack
1987 – Dangerous Attraction
1989 – Trouble in Angel City

Bad Moon Rising
1991 – Full Moon Fever
1991 – Bad Moon Rising
1993 – Blood
1993 – Blood on the Streets
1995 – Opium for the Masses
1995 – Moonchild(Single)
1995 – Junkyard Haze
1999 – Flames on the Moon
2005 – Full Moon Collection

References

External links
 Lion History
 Fan website
 Dangerous Attraction

Scottish rock singers
Scottish heavy metal musicians
Glam metal musicians
Living people
1963 births
British hard rock musicians